Keelback may refer to any of the following snake genera:
 Rhabdophis
 Helicops